Metatartaric acid is a food additive.  Chemically, it is a polymeric lactone of variable composition and different molecular weights obtained through a dehydration reaction by heating tartaric acid.

Uses
As a food additive, it has the E number E353 and is classified as an acidity regulator.  It is added to wine to prevent the precipitation of potassium hydrogen tartrate and calcium tartrate.

References 

Lactones
E-number additives